is a Japanese camping-themed manga series written and illustrated by Yudai Debata. It wasserialized in Kodansha's seinen manga magazine Evening from October 2018 to February 2023, when the magazine ceased its publication. Its chapters have been collected in 13 tankōbon volumes as of July 2022.

Characters

An expert 34-year-old out-and-out solo camper who enjoys the quiet solitude away from the city, being able to appreciate nature.

A 20-year-old junior college student with little experience about camping alone. She asks Gen to be her mentor in order to develop her solo camping skills by (contradictorily) camping together until she is able to manage on her own.

Publication
Futari Solo Camp is written and illustrated by Yudai Debata. It debuted in Kodansha's seinen manga magazine Evening, under the title . Evening ceased its publication on February 28, 2023, and the series finished its first part in the last issue; following three special chapters to be published on Comic Days manga app, the series will be transferred to Morning. Kodansha has collected its chapters into individual tankōbon volumes. The first volume was released on March 22, 2019. As of July 22, 2022, thirteen volumes have been released.

Volume list

Reception
As of the December 2020, the manga had over 1 million copies in circulation (including digital versions). Futari Solo Camp was nominated for the 45th Kodansha Manga Award in the general category in 2021.

References

Further reading

External links
  

Camping in anime and manga
Kodansha manga
Seinen manga